Konyushino is a rural locality (a village) in Vyatkinskoye Rural Settlement, Sudogodsky District, Vladimir Oblast, Russia. The population was 5 as of 2010.

Geography 
Konyushino is located 48 km northwest of Sudogda (the district's administrative centre) by road. Borisogleb is the nearest rural locality.

References 

Rural localities in Sudogodsky District